Extended ASCII is a repertoire of character encodings that include (most of) the original 96 ASCII character set, plus up to 128 additional characters. There is no formal definition of "extended ASCII", and even use of the term is sometimes criticized, because it can be mistakenly interpreted to mean that the American National Standards Institute (ANSI) had updated its  standard to include more characters, or that the term  identifies a single unambiguous encoding, neither of which is the case.

The ISO standard ISO 8859 was the first international standard to formalise a (limited) expansion of the ASCII character set: of the many language variants it encoded, ISO 8859-1 ("ISO Latin 1")which supports most Western European languages is best known in the West. There are many other extended ASCII encodings (more than 220 DOS and Windows codepages). EBCDIC ("the other" major character code) likewise developed many extended variants (more than 186 EBCDIC codepages) over the decades.

The technology has largely been rendered technically obsolete by Unicode, which has code points for all the characters encoded in the various attempts to extend ASCII.  All modern operating systems use this technology. Nevertheless, the topic remains important in the history of computing.

History

ASCII was designed in the 1960s for teleprinters and telegraphy, and some computing. Early teleprinters were electromechanical, having no microprocessor and just enough electromechanical memory to function. They fully processed one character at a time, returning to an idle state immediately afterward; this meant that any control sequences had to be only one character long, and thus a large number of codes needed to be reserved for such controls. They were typewriter-derived impact printers, and could only print a fixed set of glyphs, which were cast into a metal type element or elements; this also encouraged a minimum set of glyphs.

Seven-bit ASCII improved over prior five- and six-bit codes. Of the 27=128 codes, 33 were used for controls, and 95 carefully selected printable characters (94 glyphs and one space), which include the English alphabet (uppercase and lowercase), digits, and 31 punctuation marks and symbols: all of the symbols on a standard US typewriter plus a few selected for programming tasks. Some popular peripherals only implemented a 64-printing-character subset: Teletype Model 33 could not transmit "a" through "z" or five less-common symbols ("`", "{", "|", "}", and "~"). and when they received such characters they instead printed "A" through "Z" (forced all caps) and five other mostly-similar symbols ("@", "[", "\", "]", and "^").

The ASCII character set is barely large enough for US English use and lacks many glyphs common in typesetting, and far too small for universal use. Many more letters and symbols are desirable, useful, or required to directly represent letters of alphabets other than English, more kinds of punctuation and spacing, more mathematical operators and symbols (× ÷ ⋅ ≠ ≥ ≈ π etc.), some unique symbols used by some programming languages, ideograms, logograms, box-drawing characters, etc. For years, applications were designed around the 64-character set and/or the 95-character set, so several characters acquired new uses. For example, ASCII lacks "÷", so most programming languages use "/" to indicate division.

The biggest problem for computer users around the world was other alphabets. ASCII's English alphabet almost accommodates European languages, if accented letters are replaced by non-accented letters or two-character approximations. Modified variants of 7-bit ASCII appeared promptly, trading some lesser-used symbols for highly desired symbols or letters, such as replacing "#" with "£" on UK Teletypes, "\" with "¥" in Japan or "₩" in Korea, etc. At least 29 variant sets resulted. 12 code points were modified by at least one modified set, leaving only 82 "invariant" codes. Programming languages however had assigned meaning to many of the replaced characters, work-arounds were devised such as C  three-character sequences "??<" and "??>" to represent "{" and "}". Languages with dissimilar basic alphabets could use transliteration, such as replacing all the Latin letters with the closest match Cyrillic letters (resulting in odd but somewhat readable text when English was printed in Cyrillic or vice versa). Schemes were also devised so that two letters could be overprinted (often with the backspace control between them) to produce accented letters. Users were not comfortable with any of these compromises and they were often poorly supported.

When computers and peripherals standardized on eight-bit bytes in the 1970s, it became obvious that computers and software could handle text that uses 256-character sets at almost no additional cost in programming, and no additional cost for storage. (Assuming that the unused 8th bit of each byte was not reused in some way, such as error checking, Boolean fields, or packing 8 characters into 7 bytes.) This would allow ASCII to be used unchanged and provide 128 more characters. Many manufacturers devised 8-bit character sets consisting of ASCII plus up to 128 of the unused codes. Since Eastern Europe were politically separated at the time, 8-bit encodings which covered all the more used European (and Latin American) languages, such as Danish, Dutch, French, German, Portuguese, Spanish, Swedish and more could be made, often called "Latin" or "Roman".

128 additional characters is still not enough to cover all purposes, all languages, or even all European languages, so the emergence of many proprietary and national ASCII-derived 8-bit character sets was inevitable. Translating between these sets (transcoding) is complex (especially if a character is not in both sets); and was often not done, producing mojibake (semi-readable resulting text, often users learned how to manually decode it). There were eventually attempts at cooperation or coordination by national and international standards bodies in the late 1990s, but manufacture proprietary sets remained the most popular by far, primarily because the standards excluded many popular characters.

Proprietary extensions

Various proprietary modifications and extensions of ASCII appeared on non-EBCDIC mainframe computers and minicomputers, especially in universities.

Hewlett-Packard started to add European characters to their extended 7-bit / 8-bit ASCII character set HP Roman Extension around 1978/1979 for use with their workstations, terminals and printers. This later evolved into the widely used regular 8-bit character sets HP Roman-8 and HP Roman-9 (as well as a number of variants).

Atari and Commodore home computers added many graphic symbols to their non-standard ASCII (Respectively, ATASCII and PETSCII, based on the original ASCII standard of 1963).

The TRS-80 character set for the TRS-80 home computer added 64 semigraphics characters (0x80 through 0xBF) that implemented low-resolution block graphics. (Each block-graphic character displayed as a 2x3 grid of pixels, with each block pixel effectively controlled by one of the lower 6 bits.)

IBM introduced eight-bit extended ASCII codes on the original IBM PC and later produced variations for different languages and cultures. IBM called such character sets code pages and assigned numbers to both those they themselves invented as well as many invented and used by other manufacturers. Accordingly, character sets are very often indicated by their IBM code page number. In ASCII-compatible code pages, the lower 128 characters maintained their standard US-ASCII values, and different pages (or sets of characters) could be made available in the upper 128 characters. DOS computers built for the North American market, for example, used code page 437, which included accented characters needed for French, German, and a few other European languages, as well as some graphical line-drawing characters. The larger character set made it possible to create documents in a combination of languages such as English and French (though French computers usually use code page 850), but not, for example, in English and Greek (which required code page 737).

Apple Computer introduced their own eight-bit extended ASCII codes in Mac OS, such as Mac OS Roman. The Apple LaserWriter also introduced the Postscript character set.

Digital Equipment Corporation (DEC) developed the Multinational Character Set, which had fewer characters but more letter and diacritic combinations. It was supported by the VT220 and later DEC computer terminals. This later became the basis for other character sets such as the Lotus International Character Set (LICS), ECMA-94 and ISO 8859-1.

ISO 8859 and proprietary adaptations
Eventually, ISO released this standard as ISO 8859 describing its own set of eight-bit ASCII extensions. The most popular is ISO 8859-1, also called ISO Latin 1, which contained characters sufficient for the most common Western European languages.
Variations were standardized for other languages as well: ISO 8859-2 for Eastern European languages and ISO 8859-5 for Cyrillic languages, for example.

One notable way in which ISO character sets differ from code pages is that the character positions 128 to 159, corresponding to ASCII control characters with the high-order bit set, are specifically unused and undefined in the ISO standards, though they had often been used for printable characters in proprietary code pages, a breaking of ISO standards that was almost universal.

Microsoft later created code page 1252, a compatible superset of ISO 8859–1 with extra characters in the ISO unused range, in particular "curly" quotation marks.
Code page 1252 is the standard character encoding of western European language versions of Microsoft Windows, including English versions.
ISO 8859-1 is the common 8-bit character encoding used by the X Window System, and most Internet standards used it before Unicode.

Character set confusion
The meaning of each extended code point can be different in every encoding. In order to correctly interpret and display text data (sequences of characters) that includes extended codes, hardware and software that reads or receives the text must use the specific extended ASCII encoding that applies to it. Applying the wrong encoding causes irrational substitution of many or all extended characters in the text.

Software can use a fixed encoding selection, or it can select from a palette of encodings by defaulting, checking the computer's nation and language settings, reading a declaration in the text, analyzing the text, asking the user, letting the user select or override, and/or defaulting to last selection. When text is transferred between computers that use different operating systems, software, and encodings, applying the wrong encoding can be commonplace.

Because the full English alphabet and the most-used characters in English are included in the seven-bit code points of ASCII, which are common to all encodings (even most proprietary encodings), English-language text is less damaged by interpreting it with the wrong encoding, but text in other languages can display as mojibake (complete nonsense). Because many Internet standards use ISO 8859-1, and because Microsoft Windows (using the code page 1252 superset of ISO 8859-1) is the dominant operating system for personal computers today, unannounced use of ISO 8859-1 is quite commonplace, and may generally be assumed unless there are indications otherwise.

Many communications protocols, most importantly SMTP and HTTP, require the character encoding of content to be tagged with IANA-assigned character set identifiers.

Usage in computer-readable languages
For programming languages and document languages such as C and HTML, the principle of Extended ASCII is important, since it enables many different encodings and therefore many human languages to be supported with little extra programming effort in the software that interprets the computer-readable language files.

The principle of Extended ASCII means that:
all ASCII bytes (0x00 to 0x7F) have the same meaning in all variants of extended ASCII,
bytes that are not ASCII bytes are used only for free text and not for tags, keywords, or other features that have special meaning to the interpreting software.

A computer language that supports Extended ASCII can also support UTF-8 without any changes, this was a major factor in UTF-8's popularity.

See also
ASCII
ASCII art
Digraphs and trigraphs
Input method
List of Unicode characters
UTF-8
KOI-8

References

External links
Roman Czyborra's Unicode and extended ASCII information pages
A short page on ASCII, with the OEM 8-bit chart and the ANSI 8-bit chart

Character sets
ASCII